Thomas Welborn Myers (born August 13, 1943) is a former American football quarterback who played for two seasons in the National Football League. He was drafted by the Detroit Lions in the fourth round of the 1965 NFL Draft, and the Denver Broncos in the twelfth round of the 1965 AFL Draft. He played for the Lions from 1965–1966. He played college football at Northwestern.

Early years
Myers threw 33 touchdown passes as a senior at Troy High School in Troy, Ohio. In his career, he passed for 73 touchdowns total. He made the Ohio State High School All-Stars team following his senior year.

College career
Myers was named the starting quarterback for the Northwestern Wildcats as a freshman during spring practice;
however, under eligibility rules of the day, Myers actually could not play in a game until his sophomore year.

Professional career
Myers was drafted by the Detroit Lions in the fourth round (46th overall) of the 1965 NFL Draft and by the Denver Broncos in the twelfth round (89th overall) of the 1965 AFL Draft. He chose to sign with the Lions, and played in two games in his two NFL seasons.

References

External links
Northwestern Wildcats football bio

1943 births
Living people
People from Piqua, Ohio
Players of American football from Ohio
American football quarterbacks
Northwestern Wildcats football players
Detroit Lions players